Lorna Cordeiro, (born 9 August 1944) also known as Lorna, is a Konkani singer from the coastal state of Goa, India, and is popularly known as the "Nightingale of Goa".

Early and personal life
Lorna was born in Bombay on 9 August 1944 to Cecelia and Theophilus Cordeiro who hailed from Saligao, Goa, she is the third of their six children. Her family belonged to the Goan Catholic community. Lorna's father encouraged his children in music and to speak Konkani at home; their immediate neighbour in Goa, recalls being very impressed by the family's singing of Konkani hymns.  Lorna recalled how as a young girl another Parsi neighbour in Mumbai would clap and gift her four Indian annas whenever he heard her sing along with the radio. 

Lorna admittingly was in an affair with an older married Goan musician, Chris Perry, while they were both working together. However, following their breakup on her 27th birthday in 1973, she was unable to perform for nearly 23 years. This was because Perry would threaten and even strike anyone who would approach her to sing professionally again. She remained unmarried because Perry also threatened possible suitors. She began working as a compounder in a dentist's clinic, and was a victim of alcoholism before Ronnie Monserrate convinced her to start singing again in 1995. She now lives in Dhobitalao, Mumbai.

Career

Initial career (1960–1973)
Lorna's singing career began by singing at weddings as part of a band called 'Bajaj and his Dance Band'. She was recognized by musician, drummer and compère Raymond Albuquerque, who first heard her sing "Where The Boys Are" on Marvé Beach. He then invited her to sing "Under the Mango Tree" from Dr. No with his band at the Bandra fair. This performance impressed Chris Perry, who was in the audience and had been looking for a crooner. After an audition, she began singing for Perry's band at the age of 15 and continued with them until she turned 26. He thus helped her launch her career and she regards him as her guru. She was a popular jazz singer in nightclubs and star hotels in Mumbai, Calcutta, Madras, Delhi and Bangalore. Later, she sang songs composed / arranged by Chris Perry.

Lorna's first song was "Bebdo", which she performed on Miramar Beach, Goa, shocking the crowd with a song of this type in Konkani. She soon became well-known for her other songs, such as "Nachomia Kumpasar", "Pisso", "Red Rose", "Lisboa", "Adeus", "Tuzo Mog", "Noxibak Roddttam", "Abghat", "Calangute", "Aik Re Khobrankara", "Sorga Rajeant", "Pavsachea Tempar", "Amerikak Pavxi", "Sorg Tujea Dolleamni", "Tum Ani Hanv", "Ugddas" and "Mhoji Mai". She became so popular that the public started demanding just her solo performances from Perry, who bound her by contract to not perform with anyone else for twenty years. She subsequently left music for a period of 23 years after a disagreement with him when she was 26 years old.

Comeback and other projects (1995–present)
In 1995, music director Ronnie Monseratte, who had been a part of Perry's band, managed to convince her to sing again. After a year of hesitation, she agreed to perform in a concert titled 'Hello Lorna', which was directed by Monseratte. However, on the day of the first show at Miramar Beach, on 1 December 1995, Perry came to the venue and showed the media the contract that she had signed to not sing with anyone else and threatened legal proceedings. After hiring new musicians, the concert began with Lorna performing "Aikat Mazo Tavlo". The concert's songs were released in a 1996 album of the same name.

In her illustrious career, Lorna has sung for many great Bollywood music directors such as Bappi Lahiri, Kalyanji-Anandji, Laxmikant–Pyarelal and Rajesh Roshan. She has even sung alongside Mohammed Rafi ("Maria") and Sudesh Bhosle. After her comeback, she has performed in countries of the Middle East like Dubai, Kuwait, Qatar and Bahrain and even in parts of Europe like London. She is seen performing in the 2004 Konkani film Aleesha, and the 2019 Konkani musical film, Kantaar, features Lorna singing some jazz songs.

Films & Ad Films

Films
 Bombay Velvet, the Bollywood film, is set in the 1960s and Lorna's voice was inspirational to Bollywood actress Anushka Sharma. Anurag Kashyap says that Anushka's character is a tribute to Lorna.

 Nachom-ia Kumpasar, is a Konkani film. It is based on the lives of jazz musicians Chris Perry and Lorna. The film takes its title from the name of a song by the two artists. The story is told through over 20 popular Konkani songs from the 1960s and 1970s that have been re-recorded for this film. It is set in the 1960s and is a tribute to the 'unsung' Konkani musicians of that era.

Advertisements
An international ad campaign by Nike for its cricket equipment featured a Konkani song "Rav Patrao Rav", sung by Ella Castellino, based on the song "Bebdo" as the theme music. The lyrics to the new song were written by Agnello Dias (who worked in the JWT advertising agency that made the ad) and it was recomposed by Ram Sampath.

Lorna is a Brand Ambassador and also inaugurated "The Goan Sip" packaged drinking water. She appears in the advertisement campaign video singing in the tune of "Tuzo Mog".

Awards and accolades
 In 1997, she was awarded the title of Best Female Singer in Mumbai, alongside Alfred Rose, who won the title of Best Male Singer
 In 2015, Lorna was presented with a Lifetime Achievement award at the "Film, Food, Fashion Festival", by Vishnu Wagh, then MLA and Vice-Chairman of Entertainment Society of Goa (ESG).
 In 2018, she was awarded the Krutadnyata Puraskar (Lifetime Achievement Award) at the 11th Goa Marathi Film Festival, held at Kala Academy.

Discography

Albums
Concanim Hit Parade With Chris Perry And A Galaxy Of Top Artistes (1969), EMI, His Master's Voice
Hit Music From Goa (1977), EMI
Chris Perry's Golden Hits (1979, re-released 2006)
 Hello Lorna (1996), Ronnie M. Productions
Unforgettable Hits (2007), Sinaris

Singles

 "Aikat mazo tavlo"
 "Nachomia Kumpasar"
 "Pisso"
 "Bebdo"
 "Red Rose"
 "Lisboa"
 "Adeus"
 "Tuzo Mog"
 "Noxibak Roddttam"
 "Maria", with Mohammed Rafi
 "Sorga Rajeant"
 "Abghat"
 "Aik re khobrankara"
 "Amerikak Pavxi"
 "Sorg Tujea Dolleamni"
 "Tum Ani Hanv"
 "Ugddas"
 "Mhoji Mai"
 "Calangute"
 "Pavsachea Tempar"

References

Further reading
 About Lorna
 Tiart ani tiatrist in Konkani language (a view on her tiatr career)
 Chris Perry, Lorna and the Bombay Goan music scene

External links
 
 

Goan Catholics
Singers from Goa
Konkani-language singers
Living people
1946 births
Tiatrists
People from North Goa district
Indian women playback singers
Women musicians from Goa
20th-century Indian singers
21st-century Indian singers
21st-century Indian women singers
20th-century Indian women singers
Indian women jazz singers